The sixth season of El Señor de los Cielos, an American television series created by Luis Zelkowicz, that premiered on Telemundo on May 8, 2018 and concluded on 24 September 2018.

The season was ordered in May 2017.

Synopsis 
Aurelio Casillas recovered all the lost fortune and finally feels the need to retire. But it is time for retribution, the hatred that he sowed since he sold his soul to the drug trafficking demon is now knocking on his door with the face and blood of the many innocent people he destroyed. Aurelio will understand that his riches are an illusion, and that after being the great hunter he was, he will now become the prey. The women he mistreated, the men he betrayed, the political puppets he put in power, and even his own children will turn against him.

Cast

Main 
 Rafael Amaya as Aurelio Casillas
 Carmen Aub as Rutila Casillas
 Robinson Díaz as El Cabo
 Guy Ecker as Joe Navarro
 Alberto Guerra as El Chema Venegas
 Alejandro López as El Súper Javi
 Francisco Gattorno as Gustavo Casasola
 Jesús Moré as Omar Terán Robles
 Lisa Owen as Alba Casillas
 Miguel Varoni as Leandro Quezada
 Ninel Conde as Evelina López
 Carlos Bardem as El Chivo Ahumada
 Isabella Castillo as Diana Ahumada
 Roberto Escobar as Comandante José Valdés
 María Conchita Alonso as Nora Requena
 Iván Arana as Ismael Casillas
 Fernando Noriega as El Rojo Flores
 Hector Bonilla as El Rayo López
 Matías Novoa as Amado Leal "El Águila Azul"

Recurring 

 Aracely Arambula as Altagracia Sandoval
 Eduardo Santamarina as Baltazar Ojeda
 Dayana Garroz as Ámbar Maldonado
 Karla Carrillo as Corina Saldaña / Salma Vidal
 Juanita Arias as Kashi
 Gloria Stalina as Milena
 Daniel Martínez as Guillermo Colón
 Marina de Tavira as Begoña Barraza

 Alan Slim as Jaime Ernesto Rosales
 Marisela Berti as Edith Guzmán
 Claudia Lobo as Esther
 Karen Sandoval as Laura 
 Rafael Uribe as Coronel Garañón
 Gastón Velandia as Figueroa
 Daniel Martínez Campo as Arístides Istúriz
 Carlos Serrato as Mocho
 David Ponce as Skinny
 Elsy Reyes as Carla Uzcátegui
 Carlos Gallardo as Carlos Zuleta
 Alieth Vargas as Susana
 Fernando Banda as El Vitaminas
 José Sedek as Bernardo Castillo
 Daniela Zavala as Arelis Mendoza
 Pahola Escalera as Paulina Ugalde
 Alejandro Félix as Chatarrero
 Carlos Puente as Pompeyo
 Alex Walerstein as El Greñas
 Alejandro Navarrete as El Zopilote
 Antonio López Torres as El Pulque
 Rubén Arciniegas as Samario
 Citlali Galindo as Mayra Rodríguez
 Gabriel Bonilla as Isidro Casillas
 Thali García as Berenice Ahumada
 Leonardo Álvarez as Leonardo Venegas
 Daniel Rascón as El Toro
 Carlos Balderrama as Manny
 Aquiles Cervantes as Matamoros

Production

Casting 
On March 30, 2018 People en Español magazine confirmed the first confirmed actors for the season, which are Rafael Amaya, Carmen Aub, Iván Arana, Lisa Owen, Alejandro López, and Jesús Moré. This season features the return of Robinson Díaz as El Cabo, and new cast members including María Conchita Alonso, Juana Arias, Carlos Bardem, Isabella Castillo, Ninel Conde, Guy Ecker, Alberto Guerra, Thali García, Dayana Garroz, Francisco Gattorno, and Fernando Noriega, among others.

After Mauricio Ochmann announced that he would no longer playing El Chema, actor Alberto Guerra joins the series with the same character as Ochmann.

Reception 
The premiere of the sixth season was watched by 2.14 million viewers, which made Telemundo position itself as the Spanish-language network most watched at 10pm/9c, thus outperforming its Por amar sin ley competition, that it only obtained a total of 1.44 million viewers. After the good reception obtained by the first two episodes of the season, Telemundo renewed the series for a seventh season during the Upfront for the 2018–19 television season.

Episodes

References 

El Señor de los Cielos
2018 Mexican television seasons
2018 American television seasons